Payam Mokhaberat F.C.  is an Iranian football club based in Shiraz, Iran. They currently compete in the Azadegan League.

Season-by-Season
The table below chronicles the achievements of Payam Mokhaberat Shiraz in various competitions since 2005.

Head coaches
 Jamshid Ghadiri (2005 – Jun 09)
 Mehrdad Shekari (Jun 2009 – Dec 09)
 Jafar Fatahi (Dec 2009 – Jan 10)
 Mohammad Abbassi (Jan 2010– Jan 2011)
 Asghar Akbari (Jan 2011)

Players

First Team Squad
As of March 1, 2012

For recent transfers, see List of Iranian football transfers, summer 2010''.

References

External links

Football clubs in Iran
Association football clubs established in 2000
2000 establishments in Iran